Police University is a 2021 South Korean television series directed by Yoo Kwan-mo and starring Cha Tae-hyun, Jung Jin-young and Krystal Jung. The series revolves around a police university professor with 20 years' experience in crimes detection and a computer hacker, who joins university as a first-year student. It premiered on KBS2 on August 9, 2021, and aired every Monday and Tuesday at 21:30 (KST) till October 5.

Synopsis
The story follows the life of various recruits and instructors in the National Police University.

Yoo Dong-man (Cha Tae-hyun) is a detective with 20 years of experience in criminal homicide and cyber investigation who has been sent to the Police University as a professor after a botched investigation to be an instructor in detective work. Dong-man often chats and gains hacking tools and information through the dark web with the moniker "Bird" with Kang Seon-ho (Jung Jin-young), a hacker with the alias "Yoon". While following a lead on a case of a cryptocurrency illegal gambling site which caused the death his fiancée, both Seon-ho and Dong-man cross path which unwittingly leads to bad blood.

Having no dream about his future, Seon-ho chances upon Oh Kang-hee (Krystal Jung) who dreams to be a police officer and falls in love with her at first sight. Following her footsteps, he too enrolls into the police university where he meets Yoo Dong-man again. Together, the three of them form a team for a joint investigation against the corruption happening in the school.

The series also shows conflict and harmony between professors and students within the school and corruption between criminals and the police force.

Cast

Main
 Cha Tae-hyun as Yoo Dong-man
 A detective-turned-professor at the National Police University having 20 years of experience in each department from homicide detective to a cyber investigation 
 Jung Jin-young as Kang Seon-ho 
 A freshman at the National Police University, a former hacking criminal 
 Krystal Jung as Oh Kang-hee
 A freshman at the National Police University. She has been running tirelessly to achieve her dream of becoming a police officer.

Supporting

Police University academic staff
 Hong Soo-hyun as Choi Hee-soo
 Professor of Judo Department
 Lee Jong-hyuk as Kwon Hyuk-pil
 Law professor
 Seo Ye-hwa as Baek-hee
 The director of the National Police University's Guidance Department
 Kang Shin-il as Seo Sang-hak
 In the 50s, professor of the Public Administration and in charge of the Scientific Investigation Research Society.
 Shin Seung-hwan as owner of 'Gossi Beer'
 40 years old, the owner of 'Gossi Beer' near Police University and known as 'high school professor' to the students.

Police University freshmen
 Choo Young-woo as Park Min-kyu
 20 years old, he was born into a family of lawyers and had been in the elite level courses. His life, which is unshakable everywhere and at all times. They start to split up after meeting Kang Seon-ho, who has opposite tendencies.
 Lee Dal as Roh Beom-tae
 22 years old, 1st year freshman, Kang Seon-ho's roommate
 Yoo Young-jae as Jo Joon-wook
 20 years old, 1st year freshman
 Park Seun-yeon as Min Jae-kyung
 21 years old, 1st year freshman, Kang Hee's roommate
 Lee Do-hoon as Cha Seong-soo
 20 years old, 1st year freshman, Mingyu's roommate
 Ha-Jun Jung as Park Don-ggu
 20 years old, 1st year freshman
 Min Chae-eun as Ahn Hae-ju
 20 years old, 1st year freshman
 Ain as Jo Sung-eun
 20 years old, 1st year freshman

Police University seniors
 Kim Jong-Hoon as Han Min-guk
 22 years old, 3rd year student and president of Student Council 
 Kim Jae-in as Yoon Na-rae
 22 years old, 3rd year student and member of Judo Club
 Byeon Seo-yun as Eonju Lee
 21 years old, 2nd year student and member of PR team
 Kim Tae-hoon as Kang Myung-jung
 21 years old, 2nd year student and member of Student Council
 Yoo Hyun-jong as Byeon Tae-jin
 22 years old, 2nd year student and member of Student Council

People outside Police University
 Song Jin-woo as Park Chul-jin 
 Inspector at Seoul District Office Detective Team 1
 Yoon Jin-ho as Team leader Choi
 Team leader of Seoul District Office Detective Team 1 
 Choi Seo-won Joo Kyeong-jang
 Youngest member of the Seoul District Office Detective Team 1
 Yoo Tae-woong as Head of department
  investigation manager of Seoul Regional Office

Kang-hee's family
 Kim Young-sun as Oh Jeong-ja
 40 years old, mother of Oh Kang-hee

Others
 Oh Man-seok as Yoon Taek-il
 50s, owner of Yoon Jeon-pasa. Father of Seung-beom and guardian (adoptive father) of Seon-ho
 Choi Woo-sung as Yoon Seung-beom
 20 years old, friend of Kang Seon-ho
 Lee Seong-woo as Jang Pro

Special appearance
 Song Young-jae as longtime acquaintance of Kang Seon-ho
 Kim Kwang-kyu as Kang Seon-ho's homeroom teacher. (Ep.1) 
 Hwang Seung-eon as Kim Eun-joo, Dong-man's fiancée who died in a car accident while investigating illegal gambling site.

Production

Casting
There was news on December 30, 2020, that Cha Tae-hyun received an offer for the drama titled then as Police Academy.  On February 16, 2021, Jung Jin-young was reportedly considering the offer following the end of his military service in April. On March 3, 2021, Krystal Jung's casting in Police Academy was confirmed. On March 18, 2021, Yoo Young-jae's agency J-World confirmed his appearance in the TV series. There were reports on April 6 and 17 of Hong Soo-hyun and Seo Ye-hwa being cast in the series titled then as My Little Police. In late April to early May, the leading cast was confirmed for the final title Police University. On June 16, scenes of first script reading from site were released.

Filming
On June 12, 2021, the filming schedule of drama was planned in Cheongju City, Cheongju, Cheongwon. On June 22, it was reported that an outsourced staff was tested positive for COVID-19 on the 19th. Cast members and other staff were also tested, and all of them were negative of the contagion. The production team temporarily stopped filming as a precaution, in accordance with the guidelines of health authorities. The final filming took place on September 26, a week before the finale. Filming lasted for around six months.

Release
Police University was simultaneously premiered on KBS2 and streaming media WAAVE on August 9, 2021, at 21:30 (KST). It is available for streaming on WAAVE.

Original soundtrack

Part 1

Part 2

Part 3

Part 4

Part 5

Part 6

Part 7

Viewership

Awards and nominations

References

External links
  
 Police University at Daum 
 Police University at Naver 
 
 
 

Korean Broadcasting System television dramas
2021 South Korean television series debuts
2021 South Korean television series endings
Korean-language television shows
Television series by Logos Film
South Korean college television series
Police procedural television series
Television productions suspended due to the COVID-19 pandemic
Wavve original programming